Sandra Hess (born 27 March 1968) is a Swiss actress and fashion model. She is best known for her role as Sonya Blade in the film Mortal Kombat: Annihilation, and Lieutenant Alexandra "Ice" Jensen on the television series Pensacola: Wings of Gold.

Life and career
Hess began modeling and working on television commercials when she was 15. After completing high school, she entered the University of Zurich to study law but before completing her degree she came to the United States to build an acting career.

Once settled in Los Angeles, Hess started taking acting classes. Her first role was in the 1992 film Encino Man, playing a cave-woman to Brendan Fraser's caveman character. In 1997, she played the role of Sonya Blade in the film Mortal Kombat: Annihilation, taking over the role played by Bridgette Wilson in the first film. In 1998, she portrayed Immortal bounty hunter Reagan Cole, a friend of Duncan MacLeod's, in the ninth episode of the sixth season of Highlander: The Series.

She also portrayed Andrea von Strucker / Viper in the TV movie Nick Fury: Agent of S.H.I.E.L.D. and Alexandra "Ice" Jensen in Pensacola: Wings of Gold. Her guest spots include the series Lois & Clark: The New Adventures of Superman, Sliders (Season 4 – Genesis), SeaQuest DSV, and CSI: Crime Scene Investigation.

In 2008, Hess starred as Sasha on General Hospital. In 2010, she had a guest role on Psych.

She married actor Michael Trucco in July 2009; they were wed in Mexico. She and Trucco both played the parts of lieutenants in the same unit of the Marines in the Pensacola: Wings of Gold series.

Filmography

External links
 
 

1968 births
Living people
Swiss film actresses
Swiss television actresses
20th-century Swiss actresses
21st-century Swiss actresses
Actors from Zürich